Marais Viljoen,  (2 December 1915 – 4 January 2007) was the last ceremonial State President of South Africa from 4 June 1979 until 3 September 1984. Viljoen became the last of the ceremonial presidents of South Africa when he was succeeded in 1984 by Prime Minister P. W. Botha, who combined the offices into an executive state presidency.

Early life

Viljoen was the youngest of six children of Magdalena Debora "Lenie" (de Villiers) and Gabriel Francois Viljoen. He was married on 20 April 1940 to Dorothea Maria Brink (17 September 1917 – 5 October 2005), with whom he had one daughter Elizabeth Magdalena (Elna) Viljoen.

After finishing school at Jan van Riebeeck High School in Cape Town, he went to work in the Post Office, and thereafter at the Afrikaans language newspaper, Die Transvaler, edited by Hendrik Verwoerd, who later became Prime Minister.

Early political career

Viljoen was elected to the House of Assembly as MP for Alberton, near Johannesburg, as President of the Senate, and as acting State President from 21 August 1978 to 10 October 1978, when B.J. Vorster was briefly elected to the position. Viljoen was seen as a relatively-moderate member of the National Party, which instituted apartheid.

State Presidency

After Vorster's resignation as a result of the Muldergate Scandal in 1979, Viljoen held the post of non-executive State President from 4 June 1979 until 3 September 1984. The State Presidency during this time was a ceremonial post, like that of the Governor-General, which it replaced in 1961.

Under the 1983 Constitution, the last under apartheid, the position of the State President was changed to a more powerful executive position. Viljoen retired and was replaced by P. W. Botha, who until 1984 had been the executive Prime Minister. After Viljoen had retired from public life, he continued to maintain an interest in politics.

Depiction on a coin

He is depicted on the obverse of the 1985 1 Rand coin.

Death

Viljoen died on 4 January 2007 of heart failure. He received a state funeral on 13 January 2007.

Ancestry

References

1915 births
2007 deaths
People from Robertson, Western Cape
Afrikaner people
South African people of Dutch descent
National Party (South Africa) politicians
State Presidents of South Africa
Presidents of the Senate of South Africa
Members of the House of Assembly (South Africa)
Apartheid government
Ministers of Home Affairs of South Africa
Alumni of Hoërskool Jan van Riebeeck